Msmna or Aghbulag is a village de facto in the Martuni Province of the breakaway Republic of Artsakh, de jure in the Khojavend District of Azerbaijan, in the disputed region of Nagorno-Karabakh.

History 
During the Soviet period, the village was part of the Martuni District of the Nagorno-Karabakh Autonomous Oblast.

Historical heritage sites 
Historical heritage sites in and around the village include the 18th-century monastery of Shoshkavank, and the 19th-century church of Surb Astvatsatsin.

Economy and culture 
The population is mainly engaged in agriculture and animal husbandry. As of 2015, the village has a municipal building, a house of culture, the Msmna branch of the Kolkhozashen Secondary School, and a medical centre.

Demographics 
The village has an ethnic Armenian-majority population, had 71 inhabitants in 2005, and 100 inhabitants in 2015.

References

External links 
 

Populated places in Martuni Province
Populated places in Khojavend District